The Digital Signature Algorithm (DSA) is a public-key cryptosystem and Federal Information Processing Standard for digital signatures, based on the mathematical concept of modular exponentiation and the discrete logarithm problem. DSA is a variant of the Schnorr and ElGamal signature schemes. 

The National Institute of Standards and Technology (NIST) proposed DSA for use in their Digital Signature Standard (DSS) in 1991, and adopted it as FIPS 186 in 1994. Four revisions to the initial specification have been released. The newest specification is: FIPS 186-4  from July 2013. DSA is patented but NIST has made this patent available worldwide royalty-free.  A draft version of the specification FIPS 186-5 indicates DSA will no longer be approved for digital signature generation, but may be used to verify signatures generated prior to the implementation date of that standard.

Overview
The DSA works in the framework of public-key cryptosystems and is based on the algebraic properties of modular exponentiation, together with the discrete logarithm problem, which is considered to be computationally intractable. The algorithm uses a key pair consisting of a public key and a private key. The private key is used to generate a digital signature for a message, and such a signature can be verified by using the signer's corresponding public key. The digital signature provides message authentication (the receiver can verify the origin of the message), integrity (the receiver can verify that the message has not been modified since it was signed) and non-repudiation (the sender cannot falsely claim that they have not signed the message).

History
In 1982, the U.S government solicited proposals for a public key signature standard. In August 1991 the National Institute of Standards and Technology (NIST) proposed DSA for use in their Digital Signature Standard (DSS). Initially there was significant criticism, especially from software companies that had already invested effort in developing digital signature software based on the RSA cryptosystem. Nevertheless, NIST adopted DSA as a Federal standard (FIPS 186) in 1994. Four revisions to the initial specification have been released: FIPS 186–1 in 1998, FIPS 186–2 in 2000, FIPS 186–3 in 2009, and FIPS 186–4 in 2013. A draft version of standard FIPS 186-5 forbids signing with DSA, while allowing verification of signatures generated prior to the implementation date of the standard as a document. It is to be replaced by newer signature schemes such as EdDSA.

This patent was given to "The United States of America as represented by the Secretary of Commerce, Washington, D.C.", and NIST has made this patent available worldwide royalty-free. Claus P. Schnorr claims that his  (also now expired) covered DSA; this claim is disputed.

Operation
The DSA algorithm involves four operations: key generation (which creates the key pair), key distribution, signing and signature verification.

1. Key generation
Key generation has two phases. The first phase is a choice of algorithm parameters which may be shared between different users of the system, while the second phase computes a single key pair for one user.

Parameter generation
 Choose an approved cryptographic hash function  with output length  bits. In the original DSS,  was always SHA-1, but the stronger SHA-2 hash functions are approved for use in the current DSS. If  is greater than the modulus length , only the leftmost  bits of the hash output are used.
 Choose a key length . The original DSS constrained  to be a multiple of 64 between 512 and 1024 inclusive. NIST 800-57 recommends lengths of 2048 (or 3072) for keys with security lifetimes extending beyond 2010 (or 2030).
 Choose an -bit prime .
 Compute . In the rare case that  try again with a different . Commonly  is used. This modular exponentiation can be computed efficiently even if the values are large.
These may be shared between different users of the system.

Per-user keys
Given a set of parameters, the second phase computes the key pair for a single user:
 Compute .

2. Key distribution
The signer should publish the public key . That is, they should send the key to the receiver via a reliable, but not necessarily secret, mechanism. The signer should keep the private key  secret.

3. Signing
A message  is signed as follows:
 Choose an integer  randomly from 
 Compute . In the unlikely case that , start again with a different random .
 Compute . In the unlikely case that , start again with a different random .
The signature is 

The modular exponentiation in computing  is the most computationally expensive part of the signing operation, but it may be computed before the message is known.
Calculating the modular inverse  is the second most expensive part, and it may also be computed before the message is known.

4. Signature Verification
One can verify that a signature  is a valid signature for a message  as follows:
 Compute .
 Compute .
 Compute .
 Compute .
 The signature is valid if and only if .

Correctness of the algorithm
The signature scheme is correct in the sense that the verifier will always accept genuine signatures. This can be shown as follows:

First, since , it follows that  by Fermat's little theorem.

The signer computes

Thus

Since  has order  we have

Finally, the correctness of DSA follows from

Sensitivity
With DSA, the entropy, secrecy, and uniqueness of the random signature value  are critical. It is so critical that violating any one of those three requirements can reveal the entire private key to an attacker.

This issue affects both DSA and Elliptic Curve Digital Signature Algorithm (ECDSA) – in December 2010, the group fail0verflow announced the recovery of the ECDSA private key used by Sony to sign software for the PlayStation 3 game console. The attack was made possible because Sony failed to generate a new random  for each signature.

This ensures that  is different for each  and unpredictable for attackers who do not know the private key .

In addition, malicious implementations of DSA and ECDSA can be created where  is chosen in order to subliminally leak information via signatures. For example, an offline private key could be leaked from a perfect offline device that only released innocent-looking signatures.

Implementations 
Below is a list of cryptographic libraries that provide support for DSA:
 Botan
 Bouncy Castle
 cryptlib
 Crypto++
 libgcrypt
 Nettle
 OpenSSL
 wolfCrypt
 GnuTLS

See also
 Modular arithmetic
 RSA (cryptosystem)
 ECDSA

References

External links
 FIPS PUB 186-4: Digital Signature Standard (DSS), the fourth (and current) revision of the official DSA specification.
 Recommendation for Key Management -- Part 1: general, NIST Special Publication 800-57, p. 62–63

Public-key cryptography
Digital signature schemes
Digital Signature Standard
1991 introductions